Kopf is a surname. Notable people with the surname include:
 Abigail Kopf, American mass shooting survivor
 Brian Kopf, Historian and Economist 
 David Kopf, American research scholar on South Asian history
 Herb Kopf (1901–1996), American football coach
 Hinrich Wilhelm Kopf (1893–1961), German politician
 Jakub Kopf (1915–1983), Polish basketball player
 Karlheinz Kopf (born 1957), Austrian politician
 Larry Kopf (1890–1986), American baseball player
 Silas Kopf (born 1949), American furniture maker 
 Richard G. Kopf (born 1946), American federal judge
 Wally Kopf (1899–1979), German American professional baseball player

See also
 Kemptner Kopf, a mountain of Bavaria, Germany
 Siplinger Kopf, a mountain of Bavaria, Germany
 Wiedemer Kopf, a mountain of Bavaria, Germany
 Niedensteiner Kopf, a mountain of Schwalm-Eder-Kreis, Hesse, Germany
 Mappershainer Kopf, a mountain peak in the Taunus range, Hesse, Germany